Gilt Club was a restaurant in Portland, Oregon, operating in Old Town Chinatown from 2005 to 2014.

History
In 2005, Owner Jamie Dunn opened the restaurant at the corner of Everett and Broadway in the northwest Portland part of Old Town Chinatown. Gilt Club appeared on the Food Network and Portlandia. Executive chef Chris Carriker left in 2013. The restaurant closed in 2014.

Reception
In 2016, Grant Butler included Gilt Club in The Oregonian overview of "97 long-gone Portland restaurants we wish were still around".

References

External links

 The Gilt Club at Fodor's
 The Gilt Club at the Food Network
 Gilt Club at Portland Monthly
 Gilt Club at Zomato

2005 establishments in Oregon
2014 disestablishments in Oregon
Defunct restaurants in Portland, Oregon
Northwest Portland, Oregon
Old Town Chinatown
Restaurants disestablished in 2014
Restaurants established in 2005